Lieutenant-General Sir Peter Royson Duffell  (born 19 June 1939) was Commander of British Forces in Hong Kong.

Military career
Educated at Dulwich College, Duffell was commissioned into the 2nd Gurkha Rifles in 1960. He served with his Regiment in Malaya during the Malayan Emergency and in Borneo during the Indonesia–Malaysia confrontation as well as in Northern Ireland. He was appointed Commander of British Forces in Hong Kong in 1989 and then became Inspector-General Doctrine and Training in 1992. He retired from the Army in 1995.

Later life
Following his retirement from the Army, he became Chief Executive of Dechert LLP. He is also a member of the advisory board of the School of Oriental and African Studies and a Trustee of The Foyle Foundation.

Personal life
Duffell married Ann Murray Woodd, daughter of Colonel Basil Bethune Neville Woodd, of a landed gentry family of Shynewood, Shropshire; they have a son, the cricketer Charlie Duffell, and daughter, Rachel.

References

People educated at Dulwich College
British Army lieutenant generals
Royal Gurkha Rifles officers
Knights Commander of the Order of the Bath
Commanders of the Order of the British Empire
Recipients of the Military Cross
1939 births
Living people
British Army personnel of the Malayan Emergency
British Army personnel of the Indonesia–Malaysia confrontation